Karatu or Karatu Town (Kata na Mji wa Karatu in Swahili) is an administrative ward and district capital located in the Karatu District of the Arusha Region of Tanzania. The ward town is bordered on its north side by Ganako ward, to the east by Rhotia ward, to the south by Endamarariek ward, and to the west by Qurus ward. According to the 2012 census, the ward has a total population of 26,617.
Karatu ward is the most populous ward in Karatu district and is the capital of Karatu District.

Economy
Karatu is a small town in the Arusha District, excellently positioned on the borders of Lake Manyara National Park and Ngorongoro Crater, giving it the nickname 'Safari Junction'. It is frequently utilized as a quick stopover in between safari expeditions or as a less expensive lodging alternative than staying on the rim of the Crater and within Lake Manyara National Park. 

The Karatu Market - On the 7th and 25th of each month, local sellers will gather in Karatu for a large market, giving you the opportunity to admire finely created things, purchase souvenirs, and practice your haggling abilities. The market on the 25th is a little smaller, but if none of these dates work for you, there is a daily small market in the town center.

Demographics
The Iraqw, a primarily Christian people, are the dominant tribe of Karatu. Their language is linguistically distinct because it originated in Ethiopia. They are farmers who gain from selling cultural artifacts such as pottery to tourists going to and from the Ngorongoro Conservation Area.

Administration
The postal code for Karatu Ward is 23601. 
The ward is divided into the following neighborhoods: 
 Gyekrum Arusha
 Gyekrum
 Karatu Mjini

Government 
The ward, like every other ward in the country, has local government offices based on the population served. The Karatu Ward administration building houses a court as per the Ward Tribunal Act of 1988, including other vital departments for the administration the ward. The ward has the following administration offices:

 Karatu Ward Police Station located in Katu Mjini neighbirhood
 Karatu Ward Government Office (Afisa Mtendaji, Kata ya Karatu) in Karatu Mjini Neighborhood
 Karatu Ward Tribunal (Baraza La Kata)  is a Department inside Ward Government Office

In the local government system of Tanzania, the ward is the smallest democratic unit. Each ward is composed of a committee of eight elected council members which include a chairperson, one salaried officer (with no voting rights), and an executive officer. One-third of seats are reserved for women councillors.

Education and health

Education
The home to these educational institutions:
Karatu Secondary School
Karatu Teachers College
Karatu Primary School
Bwawani Primary School
Karatu Boys High School

Healthcare
The ward is home to the following health institutions: 
Karatu Health Center

References

Karatu District
Wards of Arusha Region